Trevi Moran (formerly known as Trevor Moran; September 30, 1998) is an American singer and YouTube personality. She rose to fame after participating in The X Factor in 2012 at the age of 13. As of April 2020, Moran's YouTube channel surpassed 1.4 million subscribers.

Early life
Moran was born in Poway, California, on September 30, 1998. She has an older brother. Moran first joined YouTube in 2008 at age 10, where she began uploading videos of herself dancing to popular songs at the Apple Store, titled "Apple Store Dances". In August 2012, Moran joined the YouTuber group Our2ndLife along with Connor Franta, JC Caylen, Kian Lawley, Ricky Dillon, and Sam Pottorff, which hit three million subscribers before disbanding in December 2014.

Career
In 2012, Moran first garnered attention when auditioning for The X Factor with the LMFAO song "Sexy and I Know It" (2011) at age thirteen. Moran received four votes from the judges, but was later eliminated during the "Boot Camp" stage. She was then chosen to be part of the live auditions held in San Francisco. In early September 2013, Moran released her debut major-label single entitled "Someone". In early December 2013, Moran released another single, entitled "The Dark Side" with much success and entered the Billboard Dance/Electronic Digital Songs chart at number 25. In June 2014, Moran released a single titled "Echo" and later another three singles titled "XIAT", "Now or Never", and "Slay" from her EP titled XIAT. On December 9, Moran released her debut EP XIAT charting at number one on Billboards Top Heatseekers chart.

Personal life
On October 9, 2015, Moran publicly came out as gay in a YouTube video. In December 2017, she announced that, during the year, she underwent what she called an "identity crisis" and questioned whether she may be transgender before concluding that, at that time, she was not.

On June 6, 2020, Moran came out as transgender; she had begun the process of medically transitioning two months prior.

Discography

Extended plays

Singles

As lead artist

As featured artist

Filmography

Television

Film

Awards and nominations

Notes

References

External links

 
 

1998 births
Living people
American socialites
American Internet celebrities
LGBT YouTubers
American LGBT musicians
The X Factor (American TV series) contestants
American women singer-songwriters
21st-century American singers
Singer-songwriters from California
People from Poway, California
LGBT people from California
Transgender women musicians
21st-century American women singers
20th-century LGBT people
21st-century LGBT people
American LGBT singers
Transgender singers